is a Prefectural Natural Park in southern Shiga Prefecture, Japan. Established in 1969, the park spans the borders of the municipalities of Higashiōmi, Kōka, Konan, Ōmihachiman, Ōtsu, Rittō, Ryūō, and Yasu; and encompasses Mount Mikami, Mount Tanakami, and the Shigaraki district.

See also
 National Parks of Japan

References

External links
Map of the Natural Parks in Shiga Prefecture (marked in pink)

Parks and gardens in Shiga Prefecture
Protected areas established in 1969
1969 establishments in Japan